The lifted index (LI) is the temperature difference between the environment Te(p) and an air parcel lifted adiabatically Tp(p) at a given pressure height in the troposphere (lowest layer where most weather occurs) of the atmosphere, usually 500 hPa (mb). The temperature is measured in Celsius. When the value is positive, the atmosphere (at the respective height) is stable and when the value is negative, the atmosphere is unstable.

Determining LI 
LI can be computed using computer algorithms but can also be determined graphically. To do this, generally, the parcel is lifted from the portion of the planetary boundary layer (PBL) that lies below the morning inversion. The air here should be about 60 to 65% RH, which is then lifted along the dry adiabat (see also adiabatic process) to the lifting condensation level (LCL), which is the intersection of that curve with the average mixing ratio in the boundary layer. Once the LCL is found, the parcel is lifted along the moist adiabat to 500 mb. It is then that one finds LI = Te(p) - Tp(p).

LI is generally scaled as follows: 
 LI 6 or Greater, Very Stable Conditions
 LI Between 1 and 6 : Stable Conditions, Thunderstorms Not Likely
 LI Between 0 and -2 : Slightly Unstable, Thunderstorms Possible, With Lifting Mechanism (i.e., cold front, daytime heating, ...)
 LI Between -2 and -6 : Unstable, Thunderstorms Likely, Some Severe With Lifting Mechanism
 LI Less Than -6: Very Unstable, Severe Thunderstorms Likely With Lifting Mechanism

Significance to thunderstorms 
The lifted index can be used in thunderstorm forecasting, however, convective available potential energy (CAPE) is considered by most as a superior measurement of instability and is preferred by many meteorologists for convection forecasting.  However, LI is easier and faster to determine without using a computer, as determining CAPE requires integration from one level to another.

See also 
 Atmospheric convection
 Atmospheric thermodynamics
 Convective instability
 Lapse rate

References

External links 
 Lifted Index (University of Illinois)
 A look at LI
 Convective indices (NWS St. Louis)
 AMS Glossary stability indices, including LI
 

Severe weather and convection
Atmospheric thermodynamics